Quar Ice Shelf is the ice shelf between Cape Norvegia and Sorasen Ridge along the coast of Queen Maud Land.

Discovery and Naming
It was mapped by the Norwegian-British-Swedish Antarctic Expedition (NBSAE) (1949–1952). The ice shelf was named after Leslie Quar, a British radio mechanic and electrician with NBSAE, who drowned when the weasel (track-driven vehicle) in which he was riding drove over the edge of this ice shelf on 24 February 1951.

The NBSAE established Maudheim Station about 1 mile south of Norsel Iceport.

References 
Ice shelves of Queen Maud Land
Princess Astrid Coast